Rakem Balogun, whose legal name is Christopher Daniels, is an American activist, best known for his involvement in a Facebook-related incident that occurred on December 12, 2017, which became headline news in the United States.

Background
Balogun enlisted as a US Marine in 2001 and served in the Iraq War in 2003. Balogun cites his time serving in the US Marine Corps as alienating due to the behaviour and racial attitudes of white officers, and left the Marine Corps 3 years into an 8-year contract on an "Other Than Honorable" discharge . Balogun became a founding member of groups such as Guerrilla Mainframe in 2008, and of the Huey P. Newton Gun Club in 2014, both based in Dallas, Texas. Balogun cites the killing of unarmed black men by police officers as the motivation for creating these groups. In 2016, Balogun distanced himself from the Huey P. Newton Gun Club, as he felt it had become too influenced by New Black Panther Party (also based in Dallas), which he identifies as being a Black Separatist organisation, something which clashed with his Socialist outlook. However, during a 2019 interview on Klepper, Balogun is seen leading a demonstration including several participants in Huey P. Newton Gun Club paraphernalia.

2017 arrest
Balogun was startled awake in his Dallas home by a large crash and police officers screaming commands on December 12, 2017, when he and his 15-year-old son were forced outside of their Dallas home dressed only in their underwear. Balogun was handcuffed and learned FBI agents were investigating domestic terrorism and had been monitoring him for years for posts on Facebook criticizing police. In particular, posts by Balogun praising Micah Johnson, the perpetrator of the 2016 shooting of Dallas police officers, were cited as grounds for Balogun's arrest. According to Balogun he was exercising his right to free speech when he praised Johnson, and was not endorsing violence against individual police officers, but a general struggle against the Dallas Police Department.

The event made worldwide news due to Balogun being the first person ever to be publicly designated a "Black Identity Extremist" by the FBI, sparking a national debate on the appropriateness of that term. In May 2018, Balogun had all charges dropped against him.

References

2017 controversies
Activists for African-American civil rights
United States Marine Corps personnel of the Iraq War
Anti-black racism in the United States
December 2017 events in the United States
Police brutality in the United States
American socialists